The Austrian composer Arnold Schoenberg published four string quartets, distributed over his lifetime: String Quartet No. 1 in D minor, Op. 7 (1905), String Quartet No. 2 in F minor, Op. 10 (1908), String Quartet No. 3, Op. 30 (1927), and the String Quartet No. 4, Op. 37 (1936).

In addition to these, he wrote several other works for string quartet which were not published. The most notable was his early String Quartet in D major (1897). There was also a Presto in C major (c. 1895), a Scherzo in F major (1897), and later a Four-part Mirror Canon in A major (c. 1933). Finally, several string quartets exist in fragmentary form. These include String Quartet in F major (before 1897), String Quartet in D minor (1904), String Quartet in C major (after 1904), String Quartet Movement (1926), String Quartet (1926), String Quartet in C major (after 1927) and String Quartet No. 5 (1949).

Schoenberg also wrote a Concerto for String Quartet and Orchestra in B major (1933): a recomposition of a work by the Baroque composer George Frideric Handel.

String Quartet in D major 

This string quartet in four movements is Schoenberg's earliest extant work of large scale: average duration of recorded performances is about 27 minutes. Completed in 1897, it was premiered privately on March 17, 1898, and publicly later that same year on December 20 in Vienna. It was published posthumously in 1966 (Faber Music, London).

Schoenberg's friend Alexander von Zemlinsky gave him much advice and criticism during the composition of this work. Zemlinsky even showed an early draft of it to Johannes Brahms, whom Schoenberg very much admired. It was given the old master's approval.

The string quartet is in four movements:

The original second movement was the Scherzo in F which now exists as a separate piece. Schoenberg substituted the Intermezzo at Zemlinsky's suggestion.

String Quartet No. 1, op. 7 

A large work consisting of one movement which lasts longer than 45 minutes, Schoenberg's First String Quartet was his first assured masterpiece, and it was the real beginning of his reputation as a composer. Begun in the summer of 1904 and completed in September 1905, this quartet is remarkable for its density and intensity of orchestration with only four instruments.

Unlike his later works, this work is tonal, bearing the key of D minor, though it stretches this to its limit with the thoroughly extended tonality of late Romantic music, such as the quartal harmony pictured at right . It also carries a small collection of themes which appear again and again in many different guises. Besides his extension of tonality and tight motivic structure, Schoenberg makes use of another innovation, which he called "musical prose." Instead of balanced phrase structures typical of string quartet writing up to that period, he favored asymmetrical phrases that build themselves into larger cohesive groups.

According to Schoenberg, when he showed the score to Gustav Mahler, the composer exclaimed: "I have conducted the most difficult scores of Wagner; I have written complicated music myself in scores of up to thirty staves and more; yet here is a score of not more than four staves, and I am unable to read them."

String Quartet No. 2, op. 10 

This work in four movements was written during a very emotional time in Schoenberg's life. Though it bears the dedication "to my wife", it was written during Mathilde Schoenberg's affair with their friend and neighbour, artist Richard Gerstl, in 1908. It was first performed by the Rosé Quartet and the soprano Marie Gutheil-Schoder.

The second movement quotes the Viennese folk song, "O du lieber Augustin". The third and fourth movements are quite unusual for a string quartet, as they also include a soprano singer, using poetry written by Stefan George. On setting George, Schoenberg himself later wrote, "I was inspired by poems of Stefan George, the German poet, to compose music to some of his poems and, surprisingly, without any expectation on my part, these songs showed a style quite different from everything I had written before. … New sounds were produced, a new kind of melody appeared, a new approach to expression of moods and characters was discovered."

The string quartet is in four movements:

Text 

The latter two movements of the Second String Quartet are set to poems from Stefan George's collection Der siebente Ring (The Seventh Ring), which was published in 1907.

Litanei
Tief ist die trauer die mich umdüstert,
Ein tret ich wieder, Herr! in dein haus.

Lang war die reise, matt sind die glieder,
Leer sind die schreine, voll nur die qual.

Durstende zunge darbt nach dem weine.
Hart war gestritten, starr ist mein arm.

Gönne die ruhe schwankenden schritten,
Hungrigem gaume bröckle dein brot!

Schwach ist mein atem rufend dem traume,
Hohl sind die hände, fiebernd der mund.

Leih deine kühle, lösche die brände.
Tilge das hoffen, sende das licht!

Gluten im herzen lodern noch offen,
Innerst im grunde wacht noch ein schrei.

Töte das sehnen, schliesse die wunde!
Nimm mir die liebe, gib mir dein glück!
Litany
Deep is the sadness that gloomily comes over me,
Again I step, Lord, in your house.

Long was the journey, my limbs are weary,
The shrines are empty, only anguish is full.

My thirsty tongue desires wine.
The battle was hard, my arm is stiff.

Grudge peace to my staggering steps,
for my hungry gums break your bread!

Weak is my breath, calling the dream,
my hands are hollow, my mouth fevers.

Lend your coolness, douse the fires,
rub out hope, send the light!

Still active flames are glowing inside my heart;
in my deepest insides a cry awakens.

Kill the longing, close the wound!
Take love away from me, and give me your happiness!

Entrückung
Ich fühle luft von anderem planeten.
Mir blassen durch das dunkel die gesichter
Die freundlich eben noch sich zu mir drehten.

Und bäum und wege die ich liebte fahlen
Dass ich sie kaum mehr kenne und du lichter
Geliebter schatten—rufer meiner qualen—

Bist nun erloschen ganz in tiefern gluten
Um nach dem taumel streitenden getobes
Mit einem frommen schauer anzumuten.

Ich löse mich in tönen, kreisend, webend,
Ungründigen danks und unbenamten lobes
Dem grossen atem wunschlos mich ergebend.

Mich überfährt ein ungestümes wehen
Im rausch der weihe wo inbrünstige schreie
In staub geworfner beterinnen flehen:

Dann seh ich wie sich duftige nebel lüpfen
In einer sonnerfüllten klaren freie
Die nur umfängt auf fernsten bergesschlüpfen.

Der boden schüffert weiss und weich wie molke.
Ich steige über schluchten ungeheuer.
Ich fühle wie ich über letzter wolke

In einem meer kristallnen glanzes schwimme—
Ich bin ein funke nur vom heiligen feuer
Ich bin ein dröhnen nur der heiligen stimme.
Rapture
I feel air from another planet.
The faces that once turned to me in friendship
Pale in the darkness before me.

And trees and paths that I once loved fade away
So that I scarcely recognize them, and you bright
Beloved shadow—summoner of my anguish—

Are now extinguished completely in deeper flames
In order, after the frenzy of warring confusion,
To reappear in a pious display of awe.

I lose myself in tones, circling, weaving,
With unfathomable thanks and unnamable praise;
Bereft of desire, I surrender myself to the great breath.

A tempestuous wind overwhelms me
In the ecstasy of consecration where the fervent cries
Of women praying in the dust implore:

Then I see a filmy mist rising
In a sun-filled, open expanse
That includes only the farthest mountain retreats.

The land looks white and smooth like whey.
I climb over enormous ravines.
I feel like I am swimming above the furthest cloud

In a sea of crystal radiance—
I am only a spark of the holy fire
I am only a whisper of the holy voice.

String Quartet No. 3, op. 30 

Schoenberg's Third String Quartet dates from 1927, after he had worked out the basic principles of his twelve-tone technique. Schoenberg had followed the "fundamental classicistic procedure" by modeling this work on Franz Schubert's String Quartet in A minor, Op. 29, without intending in any way to recall Schubert's composition. There is evidence that Schoenberg regarded his 12-tone sets—independent of rhythm and register—as motivic in the commonly understood sense, and this has been demonstrated with particular reference to the second movement of this quartet.

The piece was commissioned by Elizabeth Sprague Coolidge on March 2, 1927, though the work had already been completed by this time, and its première was given in Vienna on September 19, 1927, by the Kolisch Quartet.

The string quartet is in four movements:

String Quartet No. 4, op. 37 

The Fourth String Quartet of 1936 is very much representative of Schoenberg's late style. The slow movement opens with a long unison recitative in all four instruments while the finale has the character of a march, similar to the last movement of Schoenberg's Violin Concerto written about the same time.

The string quartet is in four movements:

References

Further reading
 Babbitt, Milton. 2003. The Collected Essays of Milton Babbitt, edited by Stephen Peles, with Stephen Dembski, Andrew Mead, and Joseph N. Straus. Princeton and Oxford: Princeton University Press. 
 Barbier, Pierre E. 1997. String Quartets nos. 1, 2, "Historical Legitimacy", included booklet. Praga Digitals PRD 250 112 HMCD 90. Prague.
 Burkholder, J. Peter. 1999. "Schoenberg the Reactionary". In Schoenberg and his World, edited by Walter Frisch, . Princeton University Press.  
 
 Harrison, Max. 1999. Schoenberg, the String Quartets, in booklet for "Four Staging Posts on Schoenberg's Musical Journey". Phillips Classics 464 046-2. Munich.
 Schoenberg, Arnold. 1997. String Quartets nos. 1 and 2. Mineola, New York: Dover Publications, Inc. 
 Stolz, Nolan. 2008. "Contrapuntal Techniques in Schoenberg's Fourth String Quartet". Eunomios (August): 1–10.

External links 
 
 
 
 
 
 

Compositions for string quartet
String quartets
String quartets
Schoenberg
Classical musical works published posthumously
Compositions that use extended techniques
1905 compositions
1908 compositions
1927 compositions
1936 compositions